This table illustrates the extent to which the substantive provisions of the European Convention on Human Rights and its Protocols are ratified (and therefore in force) for territories under the control of the members of the Council of Europe

References

European Convention on Human Rights